Tarnówek may refer to the following places in Poland:
Tarnówek, Lower Silesian Voivodeship (south-west Poland)
Tarnówek, Masovian Voivodeship (east-central Poland)
Tarnówek, Gorzów County in Lubusz Voivodeship (west Poland)
Tarnówek, Wschowa County in Lubusz Voivodeship (west Poland)